Ivan Georgiyevich Dzhukha (born September 6, 1952) is a Russian geologist and writer of Greek descent, specialised in history of persecuted Greeks in the Soviet Union during Stalins' period.

Books
Одиссея мариупольских греков: Очерки истории / Художник Е. В. Харабет. — Вологда: Изд-во ВГПИ, «ЛиС», 1993. — 160 с. — 10 000 экз. — . (Also published in Greece)
2-е дополненное и исправленное издание. М. Изд-во Международного ун-та. 2013.
 Милар (мельница): Роман-хроника (1914—1930 гг.). Донецк. Регион. 2000.
 A novel-chronicle of a Greek family which suffered dekulakization
 «Греческая операция. История репрессий против греков в СССР.» — СПб. Издательство «Алетейя», 2006. — 416 с. — (серия: «Новогреческие исследования»). — 2500 экз.. 
A book about the Greek Operation of NKVD
 «Спецэшелоны идут на Восток. История репрессий против греков в СССР. Депортации 1940-х гг.» — СПб. : Издательство «Алетейя», 2008. — 560 с., 7 ил.. — (серия: «Новогреческие исследования»). — 5500 экз.. — 24,5 см. 
 "Пишу своими словами...". История репрессий против греков в СССР: письма из лагерей, тюрем и мест спецпоселения. СПб. Алетейя. 2009.
 Стоял позади Парфенон, лежал впереди Магадан. История репрессий против греков в СССР: греки на Колыме. СПб. Алетейя. 2010.
 "Так было, я свидетель...". История репрессий против греков в СССР: Воспоминания. СПб. Алетейя. 2011.
 Так было на Кубани. История репрессий против греков в СССР: репрессий против греков на Кубани. СПб. Алетейя. 2013.
 Книга Памяти греков Краснодарского края. Жертвы 1937-1938 гг. СПб. Алетейя. 2013.

References

1952 births
Living people
People from Donetsk Oblast
Russian people of Greek descent
Ukrainian Greeks
20th-century Russian historians
Russian geologists
Greek diaspora in Russia
Persecution of Greeks in the Soviet Union
Moscow State University alumni
21st-century Russian historians